V. F. Yakovlev Ural State Law University (USLU),  formerly the Ural State Law Academy (USLA), is a public, research university which includes law schools, colleges, faculties and other public graduate and undergraduate educational institutions. USLU's main campus is situated in the Yekaterinburg, Russia. Founded in 1918, USLU is one of the largest law schools in Russia.

USLU is organized into 15 schools, colleges, and institutes, located in Yekaterinburg. USLU operates international scientific relations facilities in London, Helsinki, Nur-Sultan, Berlin, Kyiv, and Minsk.

The university has high entry requirements for its prospective students. National Universities rankings ranked the academy in 5 place of the best Law schools in the Russian Federation.

The Federal Agency for Scientific Research in information and telecommunication technologies of The Russian Federation ranked USLU in the 2nd position for the best law schools in Russia in 2008.
  In 2004, USLA was awarded by gold medal in "One hundred best universities in Russia".

History

The Siberian Institute of Soviet Law was founded on 20 April 20, 1931 in Irkutsk by the decision of the Government of the Soviet Union based on the Faculty of Law of Irkutsk State University. On 1 August 1934 the resolution of the Government of the Soviet Union transferred the Siberian Institute of Soviet Law from Irkutsk to Sverdlovsk. In 1935, the Siberian Institute of Soviet Law was renamed to Sverdlovsk Law Institute. The institute carried the name of Procurator General of the USSR Andrey Vyshinsky from 1954 to 1962 and after Prosecutor General of the USSR Roman Rudenko from 1981 to 1992. On 24 December 1992 Sverdlovsk Law Institute was renamed to Ural State Law Academy. The academy was renamed to Ural State Law University by decree of Russian Ministry of Education and Science on April 22, 2014. On 9 February 2022 the university was named after the first Chairman of the Supreme Court of Arbitration of Russia Veniamin Yakovlev.

Structure

Institutes 
 Institute of Justice 
 Institute of Business and Law
 Institute of the Prosecutor's Office
 Institute of State and International Law
 Institute of Special Educational Programs
 Institute of Additional Education
 Institute of Pre-University Training
 Department of Doctoral and Postgraduate Studies

Departments 
 Department of Administrative Law 
 Department of Civil Law
 Department of Civil Procedure
 Department of Constitutional Law
 Department of Corporate Law
 Department of Criminal Law
 Department of Criminalistics
 Department of Financial Law
 Department of History of State and Law
 Department of IT Law
 Department of International and European Law
 Department of Judicial Activity and Criminal Procedure
 Department of Labour Law
 Department of Land Law, Urban Planning Law, and Environmental Law
 Department of Legal Theory
 Department of Physical Education and Sport
 Department of Prosecutor's Activity
 Department of Russian and Foreign Languages
 Department of Social and Humanitarian Disciplines

Science

Scientists, professors and graduate students of the USLU participate in international, national and regional academic conferences and seminars.

Since 1993, the University publishes scientific, theoretical and practical research projects of its students in cooperation with the Ministry of Justice .

International Relations

USLU maintains and develops relationships with a number of leading universities in Europe and the United States.

Alumni

Over the years Ural State Law University trained over 60,000 qualified professionals.

Famous alumni 
 Sergei Alexeyev (1949), a notable Soviet and Russian legal scholar, one of the co-authors of the Constitution of Russia of 1993.
 Veniamin Yakovlev (1953), a Soviet and Russian jurist who served as the 5th Minister of Justice of the USSR from 1989 to 1990 and as the 1st Chairman of the Supreme Court of Arbitration of Russia from 1992 to 2005.
 Alexander Karlin (1972), a Russian politician who served as the 5th Governor of Altai Krai from 2005 to 2018.
 Yury Skuratov (1973), a Russian jurist who served as the 5th Prosecutor-General of Russia from 1995 to 2000.
 Yury Biryukov (1975), a Russian jurist who served as the First Deputy Prosecutor-General of Russia from 2000 to 2006 and the Senator from Kalmykia from 2014 to 2019.
 Yury Chaika (1976), a Russian jurist who served as the 6th Minister of Justice of Russia from 1999 to 2006 and the 7th Prosecutor-General of Russia from 2006 to 2020.
 Sergey Trakhimenok (1977), a Belarusian writer.
 Serhii Kivalov (1980), a Ukrainian politician who served as the 4th Head of Central Election Commission of Ukraine during the 2004 Ukrainian presidential election.
 Alexander Yevstifeyev (1980), a Russian politician who served as the 4th Head of Mari El from 2017 to 2022.
 Vladislav Tumanov (1983), a Russian politician who served as the 2nd Governor of Pskov Oblast from 1992 to 1996
 Vasily Piskaryov (1984), a Russian lawyer who served as the Deputy Head of the Investigative Committee of Russia from 2012 to 2016 and currently seves as a deputy in the 8th State Duma.
 Pavel Krasheninnikov (1989), a Russian politician and jurist who served as the 5th Minister of Justice of Russia from 1998 to 1999.
 Andrey Selivanov (1995), a Russian chess player, the World Chess Solving Champion of 2003.
 Atakhan Abilov (1999), a Talysh national minority and human rights activist from Azerbaijan.

Journals
Students at the Law School publish several legal journals:

 Lawyer
 Injust

References

Ural State Law University
Education in the Soviet Union
Universities in Sverdlovsk Oblast
Buildings and structures in Yekaterinburg
Law schools in Russia